Glyptothorax botius is a species of catfish that was first described by Hamilton 1822.  Glyptothorax botius is a species in genus Glyptothorax, family Sisoridae and order Siluriformes. IUCN categorise the species as least concern globally. No subspecies are listed in Catalogue of Life.

References 

Glyptothorax
Fish described in 1822
fish of Bangladesh